The Democratic and Social Movement (MDS) is a political party in Algeria that was founded in 1966.

History 
The party was founded in 1966 as the Socialist Vanguard Party (French: , PAGS) by Bachir Hadj Ali. Although not legally recognized, it persisted as a political opposition party throughout the one-party period in Algeria. As an outgrowth of the Algerian Communist Party (Parti Communiste Algérien), which disappeared soon after Algerian independence, the PAGS has consistently opposed the government, offering sharp criticism of all political leaders and most of their programs. Its members, referred to as "Pagsistes", had infiltrated almost every legally recognized mass association despite their unofficial status. The Pagsistes were especially prominent in such organizations as the UNJA and General Union of Algerian Workers (UGTA) encouraging leftist tendencies.

The PAGS coalition relationship with the regime ended when Chadli Bendjedid came to power, who sought to purge pagistes from positions of power within the state-party apparatus, and moved toward economic liberalization.

The party was legalized in 1989.

In 1993, PAGS was reconstructed as Ettehadi by El Hachemi Chérif. A group who wanted to retain the communist legacy of the party broke away and formed the Algerian Party for Democracy and Socialism. During the Algerian Civil War, Ettehadi strongly opposed the Islamists and supported the banning of Islamic Salvation Front, (FIS).

In 1999, Ettehadi was reconstructed as the Democratic and Social Movement (Mouvement Démocratique et Social).  In the 17 May 2007 People's National Assembly elections, the MDS won 0.89% of the vote and 1 out of 389 seats.

Regional strength 
In the Algerian legislative election, 2007, support for the MDS was higher than its national average (0.89%) in the following provinces:
 Mascara Province 6.73%
 Tissemsilt Province 3.89%
 Béjaïa Province 3.55%
 Béchar Province 2.66%
 Saïda Province 2.42%
 Tébessa Province 2.19%
 Mila Province 2.16%
 Relizane Province 2.13%
 Chlef Province 2.06%
 Sidi Bel Abbès Province 1.81%
 Tlemcen Province 1.43%
 Souk Ahras Province 1.39%
 Boumerdès Province 1.35%
 Skikda Province 1.23%
 Annaba Province 1.13%

References

External links

1966 establishments in Algeria
Political parties established in 1966
Political parties in Algeria
Socialist parties in Algeria